Ramanauskas is the masculine form of a Lithuanian family name. Its feminine forms  are: Ramanauskienė (married woman or widow) and Ramanauskaitė (unmarried woman). It is a Lithuanized form of the Polish surname Romanowski. Other Slavic equivalents: Romanovsky/Romanovskiy (Russian), Ramanouski (Belarusian). All are toponymic surnames derived from any of locations named Romanów, Romany, or Romanowo,  the latter names literally meaning "belonging to Roman."

Notable people with the surname include:

 Adam Ramanauskas (born 1980), Australian rules footballer
 Adolfas Ramanauskas (1918–1957), Lithuanian anti-Soviet partisan
 Algis Ramanauskas (born 1970), Lithuanian entertainer
  Johnny Ramensky (1905–1972), born Jonas Ramanauskas, Scottish career criminal

See also

References

Lithuanian-language surnames
Toponymic surnames